is a 1955 Japanese film directed by Kenji Mizoguchi. It is based on a prose version by Eiji Yoshikawa of a Japanese epic poem, The Tale of the Heike. It is Mizoguchi's second and last film in color, the other being Princess Yang Kwei Fei (Yōkihi) of the same year.

Critical reaction 
Ian Cameron, editor of the British film magazine, Movie, wrote in 1962: “The parallel between the historical action and the personal story gives Shin Heike Monogatari its particular beauty. Mizoguchi is arguably the greatest of directors. This is arguably his best film, and the best of all films.”

Kevin B Lee in a 2009 review for Slant Magazine found it a rather tentative attempt at color filmmaking and a self-conscious "prestige" picture, with Mizoguchi's usual themes present but at odds with the desire for spectacle and action of a samurai movie. After the American release of the film in 1964,  Eugene Archer of The New York Times wrote that the plot was "subordinate to the decor".

Various critics have suggested that the film's setting at the end of the Heian period, a politically unstable time, and its concern with the transition of power reflect the situation of Post-occupation Japan, when the film was made in the 1950s.

Cast 
 Ichikawa Raizō VIII as Taira no Kiyomori
 Ichijirō Ōya as Taira no Tadamori, father of Kiyomori
 Yoshiko Kuga as Taira no Tokiko, concubine of Kiyomori
 Naritoshi Hayashi as Taira no Tokitada, brother of Tokiko
 Tamao Nakamura as Taira no Shigeko, sister of Tokiko
 Michiyo Kogure as Empress consort Fujiwara no Taishi
 Eijirō Yanagi as Retired Emperor Shirakawa
 Hisao Toake as Regent Fujiwara no Tadamichi
 Koreya Senda as Minister of the Left Fujiwara no Yorinaga, brother of Tadamichi
 Kunitarō Sawamura as Jokū

Notes

References
  http://www.raizofan.net/link4/movie1/heike.htm

External links 
 

1955 films
Jidaigeki films
Samurai films
1950s Japanese-language films
Films directed by Kenji Mizoguchi
Daiei Film films
Films produced by Masaichi Nagata
Cultural depictions of Taira no Kiyomori
1950s Japanese films